Mount Defiant is an  elevation glaciated summit located  northwest of Valdez in the Chugach Mountains of the U.S. state of Alaska. Mount Defiant was named in 1957 by members of the Chugach Mountains Expedition which was sponsored by the Arctic Institute of North America, because the rugged ice-covered peak defied all their attempts to find a route to the summit. The mountain's name was officially adopted in 1965 by the U.S. Board on Geographic Names.

Climate

Based on the Köppen climate classification, Mount Defiant is located in a subarctic climate zone with long, cold, snowy winters, and mild summers. Weather systems coming off the Gulf of Alaska are forced upwards by the Chugach Mountains (orographic lift), causing heavy precipitation in the form of rainfall and snowfall. Temperatures can drop below −20 °C with wind chill factors below −30 °C. This climate supports hanging glaciers on the slopes and the immense Columbia Glacier surrounding this mountain. The months May through June offer the most favorable weather for climbing or viewing.

See also

List of mountain peaks of Alaska
Geography of Alaska

References

Gallery

External links
 Weather: Mount Defiant

Defiant
Defiant
Defiant